William Stokes (11 December 1857 – 16 August 1929) was an Australian cricketer. He played one first-class cricket match for Victoria in 1882.

See also
 List of Victoria first-class cricketers

References

External links
 

1857 births
1929 deaths
Australian cricketers
Victoria cricketers
Cricketers from Melbourne